Ben Power is a British dramaturg and playwright. Since 2010 he has been an associate director of the National Theatre.

He studied English at Cambridge University. He often collaborates with Rupert Goold and his Headlong company. He was dramaturg and Literary Associate on A Disappearing Number for Complicite, which won the 2007 Evening Standard, Critics’ Circle and Olivier awards for Best Play.

In 2011 he wrote the adaptation of Henrik Ibsen's epic Emperor and Galiean for the National Theater. He also participated that year in the Bush Theatre's project Sixty Six Books, for which he wrote a piece based on a book of the King James Bible.

Since it opened in 2013 he has overseen the National Theatre's temporary space, The Shed. His new version of Euripides' Medea, starring Helen McCrory in the eponymous role, ran at the National Theatre from July to September 2014.

In 2015 he was appointed deputy artistic director of the National Theatre; the role had not previously existed. Since that appointment he has condensed three works by D. H. Lawrence into a single play, presented as Husbands and Sons in the National's Dorfman theatre.

References

Living people
Year of birth missing (living people)
British dramatists and playwrights
British male dramatists and playwrights
Tony Award winners